The Immaculate Conception Cathedral is a religious building belonging to the Catholic Church and is located on Church Street beside York House in the town of Saint George, capital of the Caribbean island nation of Grenada in the Lesser Antilles.

It serves as the seat of the Catholic Diocese of Saint George (Dioecesis Sancti Georgii). The building is located atop a hill overlooking the harbor, and is one of the most important symbol of the city. In the place where it is now a small chapel existed previously completed in 1804 and dedicated to St James. The Gothic cathedral tower dates from 1818. The cathedral was completely finished in 1884.

The church had to be rebuilt because it was damaged after Hurricane Ivan in 2004. The church decoration is simple compared with European Catholic cathedrals.

See also 
 Roman Catholicism in Grenada

References 

Roman Catholic cathedrals in Grenada
Buildings and structures in St. George's, Grenada
Roman Catholic churches completed in 1884
19th-century Roman Catholic church buildings